The XII Race of Champions was a non-championship Formula One race held at Brands Hatch on 20 March 1977. The 40-lap race was won by Englishman James Hunt, driving a McLaren-Cosworth, who also set the fastest lap. South African Jody Scheckter finished second in a Wolf-Cosworth, while Northern Irishman John Watson finished third in a Brabham-Alfa Romeo, having started from pole position.

Qualifying classification

Race classification

References 

Race of Champions
Race of Champions (Brands Hatch)
Race of Champions
Race of Champions